is a railway station on the Kagoshima Main Line, operated by JR Kyushu in Ōmuta, Fukuoka Prefecture, Japan.

Lines 
Only local services on the line stop at the station.

Layout 
The station consists of a side and an island platforms serving three tracks. The station building is a wooden structure in traditional Japanese style with a tiled roof. It houses a waiting area, a ticket window and an automatic ticket vending machine. Access to the island platform is by means of a footbridge.

Since 2010, the staffing of the ticket window has been entrusted to the Ōmuta Tourist Association. The ticket window is equipped with a POS machine but does not have a Midori no Madoguchi facility.

Adjacent stations

History
Japanese Government Railways (JGR) opened the station on 15 April 1926 as an additional station on the existing track of the Kagoshima Main Line. With the privatization of Japanese National Railways (JNR), the successor of JGR, on 1 April 1987, JR Kyushu took over control of the station.

Passenger statistics
In fiscal 2016, the station was used by an average of 669 passengers daily (boarding passengers only), and it ranked 210th among the busiest stations of JR Kyushu.

References

External links
Ginsui Station (JR Kyushu)

Railway stations in Fukuoka Prefecture
Railway stations in Japan opened in 1926